No Jong-gun (born February 24, 1981) is a South Korean football player who currently plays for Yangju Citizen as the alternative of the military service. 
He most recently played for Incheon United in the K-League.

Mr. No is a tough defensive midfielder, the nickname in year 2007~2008 was 'Mr. NoEraser' due to his physical fighting and strong pressure.

Career 
In Year 2003, He entered Incheon United F.C. as the founding member, and in year 2004, he made a debut in K-league. In year 2005, he was the best member of Incheon United F.C. when the team finished the league as a runner-up. Following his successful career, he was appointed as the captain of the team and made 100 appearances in year 2008. Until entering into the army as the duty of Korean, he played 132 games and made 1 goal and 2 assist. The head coaches are fond of his natural born industry and team spirit. He is servicing in Yangju Citizen FC as the military duty.

Career statistics 
 K-League Records 
{|class="wikitable" style="text-align:center"
|- 
!Club !! Year !! Apps !! Sub !! Goal !! Assist
|-
| Incheon United || 2004 ||7 ||2|| 0||0
|-
| Incheon United || 2005 ||30 ||8|| 1||0
|-
| Incheon United || 2006 ||28 ||10|| 0||0
|-
| Incheon United || 2007 ||23 ||14|| 0||0
|-
| Incheon United || 2008 ||23 ||9|| 0||2 
|-
| Incheon United || 2009 ||19||9|| 0||0
|-
| Incheon United || 2010 ||2 ||2|| 0||0
|-
! Total (K-League)|| - ||132 ||54|| 1||2
|}
K-League records include K-League Cup records. as of the end of yr 2010.

Play style 
The assessment by the coaches were outstanding among the players of Incheon United in the view of the sincerity and work rate. His defense was so relentless and persistent in the field and his nicknames were all related to it. One of his old colleague, current TOP foreign player in K-League, Dženan Radončić gave him a nickname 'Incheon's Gennaro Gattuso'.

External links

1981 births
Living people
South Korean footballers
Incheon United FC players
K League 1 players
K3 League players
Association football midfielders
Footballers from Seoul